Apnapan ( Kinship) is a 1977 Indian Hindi-language drama film, produced and directed by J. Om Prakash under the FILMYUG Pvt. Ltd. banner. It stars Sanjeev Kumar, Jeetendra, Reena Roy and Sulakshana Pandit, and has music composed by Laxmikant Pyarelal. The film is recorded as a Super Hit at the box office. This film was remade in Telugu as Illalu (1981).

Roy played a selfish gold-digger who abandons her husband and child, which garnered her critical acclaim and a Filmfare Award for Best Supporting Actress. However, she rejected the award citing that she was among the film's protagonists and not supporting actors, thus becoming the second actress (after Vyjayanthimala for 1955's Devdas) to decline a Filmfare Award.

Plot 
Kamini (Reena Roy) abandons Anil Mehra (Jeetendra) and their baby son Prakash for her own selfish reasons. A few years later, Anil falls in love with Radhika (Sulakshana Pandit) and marries her. Radhika treats Prakash as her own son, who is now a six-year-old. Radhika meets Kamini in a store and they become friends, not knowing about each other's histories. Soon, Kamini realizes that Radhika is Anil's second wife and her own son's stepmother. She longs to be with Prakash and be a mother to him again. When he has an accident, she donates her own blood to save him and in the process, leaves behind her selfish nature. In the end, Anil doesn't give her the second chance to be a mother to Prakash. Heartbroken, she says goodbye to her son as he leaves with Anil and Radhika.

Cast 
 Jeetendra as Anil Mehra
 Reena Roy as Kamini Agarwal
 Sulakshana Pandit as Radhika Sharma
 Sanjeev Kumar as Raja Yashpal Singh (Special Appearance)
 Iftekhar as Kishan Agarwal
 Pinchoo Kapoor as Mr. Desai
 Aruna Irani as Gangubai
 Birbal as Ronak Singh
 Sudhir Dalvi as Beggar
 Nivedita Joshi-Saraf as Beggar
 Raj Mehra
 Master Bittu as Prakash

Soundtrack 
Lyrics: Anand Bakshi

Awards 
26th Filmfare Awards:

Won

 Best Supporting Actress – Reena Roy (refused)

Nominated

 Best Lyricist – Anand Bakshi for "Aadmi Musafir Hai"
 Best Male Playback Singer – Mohammed Rafi for "Aadmi Musafir Hai"

References

External links 
 

1983 films
1980s Hindi-language films
Films scored by Laxmikant–Pyarelal
Hindi films remade in other languages
Films directed by J. Om Prakash